The I.A. 50 Guaraní II is an Argentine utility aircraft designed at the DINFIA (successor to the "Instituto Aerotecnico" - AeroTechnical Institute) in the early 1960s.

Design and development

In the early 1960s, the Argentine state aviation conglomerate, DINFIA, realised that its IA 35 Huanquero twin-piston engined light transport was becoming outdated, and it was decided to develop a turboprop-engined derivative. While of similar layout to the Huanquero, with both aircraft being twin-engined low-wing monoplane of all metal construction with a twin tail, the new aircraft, the Guaraní, shared only 20% of the structure of the Huanquero. It first flew on 6 February 1962.

The aircraft was further developed as the Guaruani II; the main difference being a single swept fin and a shortened rear fuselage.  It also used more powerful Bastan VIA engines.  The fuselage was semi-monocoque with a squared cross-section, having unswept wings and swept tailplanes. The prototype Guaraní was rebuilt to this standard and flew in this form on 26 April 1963.

Operational history

In June 1965 the Guarani II prototype (serial number TX-01) was exhibited and flown at the Paris Air Show at Le Bourget Airport, France).  TX-01 was later flown to the CEV (“Centre d’Essays en Vol”, Air Test Centre) at Istres, France, for technical evaluation, where it was tested for a total of 200 flying hours.  It was flown back to the FMA, Argentina in February 1966, being the first Latin American-built aircraft to fly across the Atlantic Ocean.

The last flying example was retired on 7 January 2007 at the II Brigada Aérea (IInd Air Brigade), at Paraná, Entre Rios, Argentina and made its last flight to the National Aeronautics Museum ("Museo Nacional de Aeronáutica") of the Argentine Air Force (Fuerza Aérea Argentina), at Morón, Buenos Aires, Argentina where it was placed on display.

Operators

 Argentine Air Force
 Argentine Federal Police - One operated 1970–1981.
 Argentine Navy
 Argentine Naval Aviation
 Servicio Penitenciario Federal
 Líneas Aéreas Provinciales de Entre Ríos
 Government of Córdoba
 Government of Salta
 Ministry of National Welfare

Surviving aircraft

 Last operational G-II, retired in 2006, at the Museo Nacional de Aeronáutica de Argentina ("National Aeronautics Museum")

Specifications (IA 50)

See also

 Tucán T-3
Comparable aircraft
 Embraer EMB 110 Bandeirante
 Dassault M.D.320 Hirondelle

References
Notes

Bibliography
Article on the 50th anniversary of the "Fabrica Militar de Aviones" - listing all the aircraft developed and manufactured there since 1927, Aerospacio, Buenos Aires, 1977. (in Spanish)

Further reading

External links

 Development and Specifications
 Individual aircraft histories
 Newspaper article about the G-II
 FMA IA 50 Guaraní II at Flickr
 FMA IA 50 Guaraní II at Flickr

1960s Argentine military transport aircraft
IA 50
Aircraft first flown in 1963
Low-wing aircraft
Twin-turboprop tractor aircraft